FC Ros Bila Tserkva is a Ukrainian amateur Association football club based in Bila Tserkva, Kyiv Oblast that was expelled from the professional league after the 2010–11 season.

The club was formed in 1983.

The club's best season was in the first year competing in independent Ukraine when they finished 4th in the Ukrainian First League Group A. Since then the club has been struggling and has had numerous name changes as they find sponsors to keep the club solvent and active.

The FC Ros Bila Tserkva home ground was Trudovi Reserve.

Colours are white shirts, black shorts.

Team names
{|class="wikitable"
|-bgcolor="#efefef"
|Year
|Name
|-
|1983–88
|Dynamo Irpin
|-
|1988–92
|Dynamo
|-
|1992–94
|Ros
|-
|1994–95
|Transimpleks-Ros
|-
|1996
|Ros
|-
|1997
|Domobudivnyk
|-
|1997–02
|Rihonda
|-
|2002–
|Ros
|}

League and cup history

{|class="wikitable"
|-bgcolor="#efefef"
! Season
! Div.
! Pos.
! Pl.
! W
! D
! L
! GS
! GA
! P
!Domestic Cup
!colspan=2|Europe
!Notes
|-
|align=center|1992
|align=center|2nd "B"
|align=center|4
|align=center|26
|align=center|13
|align=center|5
|align=center|8
|align=center|40
|align=center|32
|align=center|31
|align=center|1/32 finals
|align=center|
|align=center|
|align=center|
|-
|align=center|1992–93
|align=center|2nd
|align=center|21
|align=center|42
|align=center|10
|align=center|15
|align=center|17
|align=center|40
|align=center|48
|align=center|35
|align=center|1/32 finals
|align=center|
|align=center|
|align=center bgcolor=Red|Relegated
|-
|align=center|1993–94
|align=center|3rd
|align=center|18
|align=center|42
|align=center|13
|align=center|9
|align=center|20
|align=center|35
|align=center|52
|align=center|35
|align=center|1/64 finals
|align=center|
|align=center|
|align=center|
|-
|align=center|1994–95
|align=center|3rd
|align=center|14
|align=center|42
|align=center|14
|align=center|7
|align=center|21
|align=center|41
|align=center|63
|align=center|49
|align=center|1/64 finals
|align=center|
|align=center|
|align=center|
|-
|align=center|1995–96
|align=center|3rd
|align=center|17
|align=center|40
|align=center|10
|align=center|9
|align=center|21
|align=center|28
|align=center|61
|align=center|39
|align=center|1/128 finals
|align=center|
|align=center|
|align=center|
|-
|align=center|1996–97
|align=center|3rd "A"
|align=center|15
|align=center|30
|align=center|6
|align=center|4
|align=center|20
|align=center|14
|align=center|49
|align=center|22
|align=center|1/64 finals
|align=center|
|align=center|
|align=center|
|-
|align=center|1997–98
|align=center|3rd "B"
|align=center|15
|align=center|32
|align=center|7
|align=center|10
|align=center|15
|align=center|25
|align=center|45
|align=center|31
|align=center|1/256 finals
|align=center|
|align=center|
|align=center|
|-
|align=center|1998–99
|align=center|3rd "B"
|align=center|12
|align=center|26
|align=center|4
|align=center|6
|align=center|16
|align=center|11
|align=center|40
|align=center|18
|align=center|Did not enter
|align=center|
|align=center|
|align=center|
|-
|align=center|1999-00
|align=center|3rd "B"
|align=center|10
|align=center|26
|align=center|10
|align=center|2
|align=center|14
|align=center|33
|align=center|47
|align=center|32
|align=center|1/16 finals Second League Cup
|align=center|
|align=center|
|align=center|
|-
|align=center|2000–01
|align=center|3rd "B"
|align=center|5
|align=center|28
|align=center|16
|align=center|2
|align=center|10
|align=center|34
|align=center|27
|align=center|50
|align=center|1/32 finals Second League Cup
|align=center|
|align=center|
|align=center|
|-
|align=center|2001–02
|align=center|3rd "B"
|align=center|8
|align=center|34
|align=center|15
|align=center|6
|align=center|13
|align=center|39
|align=center|45
|align=center|51
|align=center|1/128 finals
|align=center|
|align=center|
|align=center|
|-
|align=center|2002–03
|align=center|3rd "B"
|align=center|10
|align=center|30
|align=center|11
|align=center|6
|align=center|13
|align=center|24
|align=center|32
|align=center|39
|align=center|1/32 finals
|align=center|
|align=center|
|align=center|
|-
|align=center|2003–04
|align=center|3rd "B"
|align=center|13
|align=center|30
|align=center|9
|align=center|9
|align=center|12
|align=center|26
|align=center|38
|align=center|36
|align=center|1/32 finals
|align=center|
|align=center|
|align=center|
|-
|align=center|2004–05
|align=center|3rd "B"
|align=center|6
|align=center|26
|align=center|12
|align=center|3
|align=center|11
|align=center|28
|align=center|33
|align=center|39
|align=center|1/32 finals
|align=center|
|align=center|
|align=center|
|-
|align=center|2005–06
|align=center|3rd "B"
|align=center|15
|align=center|28
|align=center|5
|align=center|7
|align=center|16
|align=center|26
|align=center|45
|align=center|22
|align=center|1/32 finals
|align=center|
|align=center|
|align=center|
|-
|align=center|2006–07
|align=center|3rd "A"
|align=center|7
|align=center|28
|align=center|13
|align=center|4
|align=center|11
|align=center|36
|align=center|32
|align=center|43
|align=center|Did not enter
|align=center|
|align=center|
|align=center|
|-
|align=center|2007–08
|align=center|3rd "A"
|align=center|11
|align=center|30
|align=center|8
|align=center|6
|align=center|16
|align=center|28
|align=center|49
|align=center|30
|align=center|Did not enter
|align=center|
|align=center|
|align=center|
|-
|align=center|2008–09
|align=center|3rd "A"
|align=center|10
|align=center|32
|align=center|12
|align=center|8
|align=center|12
|align=center|38
|align=center|38
|align=center|44
|align=center|1/64 finals
|align=center|
|align=center|
|align=center|
|-
|align=center|2009–10
|align=center|3rd "A"
|align=center|7
|align=center|20
|align=center|6
|align=center|3
|align=center|11
|align=center|18
|align=center|30
|align=center|21
|align=center|1/64 finals
|align=center|
|align=center|
|align=center|
|-
|align=center|2010–11
|align=center|3rd "A"
|align=center|11
|align=center|22
|align=center|3
|align=center|2
|align=center|17
|align=center|20
|align=center|58
|align=center|8
|align=center|1/64 finals
|align=center|
|align=center|
|align=center|−3
|}

Managers
 Yevhen Zolotnytsky (1999) (playing coach)
 Vadym Lazorenko (1999-02)
 Ihor Khimanych (2002) (interim)
 Oleksandr Holokolosov (2002)
 Ihor Khimanych (2003–)

Notes and references

External links
 Unofficial site (Ukrainian)

 
Ros Bila Tserkva
Association football clubs established in 1983
1983 establishments in Ukraine
Ros Bila Tserkva
Ros Bila Tserkva
Sport in Irpin
Sports team relocations
Dynamo (Ukraine)